The following January 2019 order of battle is for the United States Coast Guard.

The headquarters of the Coast Guard is located at 2703 Martin Luther King Jr Avenue SE in Washington, D.C. The Coast Guard relocated to the grounds of the former St. Elizabeths Hospital in 2013.

The Coast Guard is divided into two area commands, the Atlantic Area and the Pacific Area, each of which is commanded by a vice admiral, with each being designated Maritime Homeland Defense Areas. Each includes various district commands.

The Coast Guard is further organized into nine districts, commanded by a District Commander, a rear admiral, with each responsible for a portion of the nation's coastline.

There are three major operational commands located outside the United States:

USCG Far East Activities (FEACT) is located at Yokota Air Base, Japan. FEACT also commands Port Security Unit’s which deploy to South Korea, helping to support U.S. Naval Forces Korea. FEACT helps inspects U.S. ships overseas and foreign ships that will be operating in the Pacific. FEACT helps by providing Maritime Safety, Security, Training and International Support.

USCG Activities Europe (ACTEUR) is located in Schinnen, The Netherlands.
Patrol Forces Southwest Asia (PATFORSWA) is based out of Manama, Bahrain. Established in 2002, the mission of PATFORSWA is to train, organize, equip, support and deploy combat-ready Coast Guard forces in support of CENTCOM and national security objectives.

Various shore establishment commands exist to support and facilitate the mission of the sea and air assets and report directly to the U.S. Coast Guard Headquarters is located in Southeast Washington, DC.

Headquarters Support Units

Deputy Commandant for Operations

The Deputy Commandant for Operations (DCO) is charged with developing and overseeing the execution of operational planning, policy, and international engagement at the strategic level The DCO is led by a Vice Admiral and is located at the USCG headquarters in Washington, D.C.
National Command Center is tasked with maintaining situational awareness, current operations information and command centers for all USCG operations worldwide and support of Department of Homeland Security, federal, state and local authorities.  It is a 24-hour operation located at the USCG headquarters in Washington, DC and led by a Rear Admiral
Assistant Commandant for Prevention Policy is tasked with developing and maintaining policy, standards and regulations pertaining to marine safety and security.  It is located at the USCG headquarters in Washington, DC and is led by a Rear Admiral.
United States Coast Guard Marine Safety Center verifies compliance of technical standards for the design, construction, alteration and repair of commercial vessels.  It's located in Washington D.C. and led by a Captain
National Maritime Center performs training, accreditation, and certification of mariners and United States Merchant Marine sailors.  It's located in Martinsburg, West Virginia and led by a Captain
*United States Coast Guard Navigation Center is tasked with ensuring safe navigation of U.S. waterways and civil GPS operations for waterway navigation. It's located in Alexandria, Virginia and led by a Captain.
Communications Station Boston, Massachusetts
Communications Station Honolulu, Hawaii
Communication Station Kodiak, Alaska
Communications Station Miami, Florida
Communications Station New Orleans, Louisiana
National Data Buoy Center
National Vessel Documentation Centerlocated in Falling Waters, West Virginia provides a register of vessels available in time of war or emergency to defend and protect the United States of America.
United States Coast Guard Marine Safety Laboratories located in New London, Connecticut provides forensic oil analysis and expert testimony in support of the oil pollution law enforcement.
Assistant Commandant for Response Policy is responsible for developing and promoting policies for all Coast Guard forces to effectively accomplish operational maritime missions. It's located in Washington D.C and led by a Rear Admiral.
United States Coast Guard National Response Force serves as a nationwide emergency call center that fields INITIAL reports for pollution and railroad incidents and forwards that information to appropriate federal/state agencies for response, similar to that of a 911 dispatch center.  It's located Washington, D.C. and commanded by a Captain.
Assistant Commandant for Capability is responsible for identifying and providing capabilities and standards in order to meet USCG mission requirements. Located in Washington, D.C. and led by a Rear Admiral.
Office of Cyberspace Forces is responsible for cyber capabilities and capacity to meet USCG mission requirements.  It is also located in Washington, D.C., and led by a Captain.

Deputy Commandant for Mission Support
.  The Deputy Commandant for Mission Support (DCMS) is responsible for all facets of mission support and life-cycle management of USCG assets. It is located alongside the USCGC headquarters in Washington D.C. and is led by a Vice Admiral.

United States Coast Guard Academy
USCGC Eagle (WIX-327)
Director of Operational Logistics 
Coast Guard Base Alameda
Coast Guard Base Boston
Coast Guard Base Cape Cod
Coast Guard Base Cleveland
Coast Guard Base Elizabeth City
Coast Guard Base Honolulu
Coast Guard Base Ketchikan
Coast Guard Base Kodiak
Coast Guard Base Los Angeles-Long Beach
Coast Guard Base Miami Beach
Coast Guard Base National Capital Region
Coast Guard Base New Orleans
Coast Guard Base Portsmouth
Coast Guard Base Seattle
Fleet Readiness Command 
United States Coast Guard Training Center Cape May
Coast Guard Aviation Training Center
United States Coast Guard Aviation Technical Training Center 
United States Coast Guard Leadership Development Center
Maritime Law Enforcement Academy
Gulf Regional Fisheries Training Center
Northeast Regional Fisheries Training Center
North Pacific Regional Fisheries Training Center
Southeast Regional Fisheries Training Center
Pacific Regional Fisheries Training Center
Joint Maritime Training Center
Training Center Petaluma
Training Center Yorktown
Force Readiness Command Training Division
Training Team East
Training Team West
National Motor Lifeboat School
Training Quota Management Center
Readiness, Standardization and Assessment Branch
Exercise Support Detachment Alameda
Exercise Support Detachment Portsmouth
Exercise Support Detachment Washington
Finance/Admin Assessment Section
Food Service Advisory Team East
Food Service Advisory Team West
Container Inspection Training and Assist Team
Armory Alameda
Armory Cape Canaveral
Armory Cape Cod
Armory New Orleans
Armory Port Clinton
Armory Seattle
Armory Terminal Island
Assistant Commandant for Human Resources
Personnel Service Center
Pay and Personnel Center
Community Services Command
Assistant Commandant for Engineering and Logistics 
Aviation Logistics Center
Surface Force Logistics Center
Shore Infrastructure Logistics Center
Civil Engineering Unit Cleveland
Civil Engineering Unit Juneau
Civil Engineering Unit Miami
Civil Engineering Unit Providence
Civil Engineering Unit Honolulu
Civil Engineering Unit Oakland
Assistant Commandant for Command, Control, Communication, Computers and Information Technology (C4&IT)
C4IT Service Center
Operations Systems Center
Assistant Commandant for Acquisitions
United States Coast Guard Research & Development Center
United States Coast Guard Intelligence Coordination Center; Coast Guard Intelligence

Headquarters direct report units
United States Coast Guard Legal Division
United States Coast Guard Office of Public Affairs
Helicopter Interdiction Tactical Squadron
Coast Guard Air Station Washington
National Pollution Funds Center

Atlantic Area

First District 

Sector Boston
Base Boston
Aids to Navigation Team Boston
Station Gloucester
Station Merrimack River
Station Port Allerton
USCGC Key Largo (WPB-1324)
USCGC Reef Shark (WPB-87371)
USCGC Pendant (WYTL-65608)
Sector Long Island Sound
Station Eatons Neck
Station Fire Island
Station Jones Beach
Station Montauk
Station New Haven
Aids to Navigation Team Long Island Sound
Station New London
Station Shinnecock
Aids to Navigation Team Moriches
Marine Safety Detachment Coram
USCGC Albacore (WPB-87309)
USCGC Bonito (WPB-87341)
USCGC Bollard (WYTL-65614)
Sector New York
Station Kings Point
Station New York
Aids to Navigation Team New York
Station Sandy Hook
Aids to Navigation Team Saugerties
USCGC Sitkinak
USCGC Shrike (WPB-87342)
USCGC Sailfish (WPB-87356)
USCGC Penobscot Bay (WTGB-107)
USCGC Sturgeon Bay (WTGB-109)
USCGC Hawser (WYTL-65610)
USCGC Line (WYTL-65611)
USCGC Wire (WYTL-65612)
Sector Northern New England
Station Portsmouth Harbor
Marine Safety Detachment Portsmouth
Station Burlington
Station Boothbay Harbor
Station Eastport
Station Jonesport
Station Rockland
Station South Portland
Aids to Navigation Team South Portland
Aids to Navigation Team Southwest Harbor
Marine Safety Detachment Belfast
USCGC Ocracoke (WPB-1307)
USCGC Amberjack (WPB-87315)
USCGC Thunder Bay (WTGB-108)
USCGC Tackle (WYTL-65605)
USCGC Bridle (WYTL-65607)
USCGC Shackle (WYTL-65609)
Sector Southeastern New England
Station Brant Point
Station Cape Cod Canal
Station Castle Hill
Station Chatham
Station Menemsha
Station Port Judith
Station Provincetown
Station Woods Hole
Aids to Navigation Team Woods Hole
Aids to Navigation Team Bristol
Marine Safety Detachment Cape Cod
Marine Safety Detachment New Bedford
USCGC Sanibel (WPB-1312)
USCGC Tybee (WPB-1330)
USCGC Hammerhead (WPB-87302)
USCGC Steelhead (WPB-87324)
USCGC Tiger shark (WPB-87359)
District controlled units and cutters
Coast Guard Air Station Cape Cod
USCGC Juniper (WLB-201)
USCGC Oak (WLB-211)
USCGC Ida Lewis (WLM-551)
USCGC Katherine Walker (WLM-552)
USCGC Abbie Burgess (WLM-553)
USCGC Marcus Hanna (WLM-554)

Fifth District 

Sector Maryland-National Capital Region
Station Annapolis
Station Crisfield
Aids to Navigation Team Crisfield
Station Curtis Bay
Station Ocean City
Station Oxford
Station St. Inigoes
Station Washington
Aids to Navigation Team Baltimore
Aids to Navigation Team Potomac
USCGC Chock (WYTL-65602)
Sector Delaware Bay
Station Atlantic City
Station Barnegat Light
Station Cape May
Aids to Navigation Team Cape May
Station Indian River
Station Manasquan Inlet
Station Philadelphia
Aids to Navigation Team Philadelphia
Marine Safety Detachment Lewes
USCGC Mako (WPB-87303)
USCGC Ibis (WPB-87338)
USCGC Crocodile (WPB-97369)
USCGC Rollin A. Fritch (WPC-1119)
USCGC Lawrence O. Lawson (WPC-1120)
USCGC Capstan (WYTL-65601)
USCGC Cleat (WYTL-65615)
Sector Virginia
Base Portsmouth
Station Cape Charles
Station Chincoteague
Aids to Navigation Team Chincoteague
Station Little Creek
Station Milford Haven
Aids to Navigation Team Milford Haven
Station Wacapreague
Aids to Navigation Team Hampton Roads
USCGC Cochito (WPB-87329)
USCGC Heron (WPB-87344)
USCGC Flying Fish (WPB-87346)
USCGC Shearwater (WPB-87349)
USCGC Sea Horse (WPB-87361)
Sector North Carolina
Station Elizabeth City
Station Emerald Isle
Station Fort Macon
Aids to Navigation Team Fort Macon
Station Hatteras Island
Station Hobucken
Station Oak Island
Aids to Navigation Team Oak Island
Station Oregon Inlet
Station Wrightsville Beach
Aids to Navigation Team Wanchese
USCGC Bayberry (WLI-65400)
USCGC Richard Snyder (WPC-1127)
USCGC Nathan Bruckenthal (WPC-1128)
District controlled units and Cutters
Coast Guard Air Station Atlantic City
Coast Guard Air Station Elizabeth City
USCGC Maple (WLB-207)
USCGC Smilax (WLIC-315)
USCGC Kennebec (WLIC-802)
USCGC Sledge (WLIC-75303)
USCGC James Rankin (WLM-555)
USCGC Frank Drew (WLM-557)
USCGC William Tate (WLM-560)

Seventh District 

Sector Charleston
Station Brunswick
Station Charleston
Aids to Navigation Team Charleston
Station Georgetown
Aids to Navigation Team Georgetown
Station Tybee Island
Aids to Navigation Team Tybee Island
Marine Safety Unit Savannah
USCGC Anvil (WLIC-75301)
USCGC Chinook (WPB-87308)
USCGC Cormorant (WPB-87313)
Sector Jacksonville
Station Mayport
Station Ponce de Leon
Aids to Navigation Team Ponce de Leon
Station Cape Canaveral
Marine Safety Detachment Port Canaveral
Aids to Navigation Team Jacksonville Beach
USCGC Hammer (WLIC-75302)
USCGC Ridley (WPB-87328)
USCGC Moray (WPB-87331)
USCGC Maria Bray (WLM-562)
Sector Key West
Station Key West
Aids to Navigation Team Key West
Station Islamoranda
Station Marathon
USCGC Charles David Jr. (WPC-1107)
USCGC Charles Sexton (WPC-1108)
USCGC Kathleen Moore (WPC-1109)
USCGC Raymond Evans (WPC-1110)
USCGC William Trump (WPC-1111)
USCGC Isaac Mayo (WPC-1112)
Sector Miami
Station Miami Beach
Station Fort Pierce
Aids to Navigation Team Fort Pierce
Station Fort Lauderdale
Aids to Navigation Team Fort Lauderdale
Station Lake Worth Inlet
Marine Safety Detachment Lake Worth
USCGC Hudson (WLIC-801)
USCGC Finback (WPB-87314)
USCGC Bluefin (WPB-87318)
USCGC Gannet (WPB-87334)
USCGC Dolphin (WPB-87354)
USCGC Bernard C. Webber (WPC-1101)
USCGC Richard Etheridge (WPC-1102)
USCGC William Flores (WPC-1103)
USCGC Robert Yered (WPC-1104)
USCGC Margaret Norvell (WPC-1105)
USCGC Paul Clark (WPC-1106)
Sector San Juan
Station San Juan
Aids to Navigation Team San Juan
Marine Safety Detachment St. Thomas
USCGC Yellowfin (WPB-87319)
USCGC Richard Dixon (WPC-1113)
USCGC Heriberto Hernandez (WPC-1114)
USCGC Joseph Napier (WPC-1115)
USCGC Winslow W. Griesser (WPC-1116)
USCGC Donald Horsley (WPC-1117)
USCGC Joseph Tezanos (WPC-1118)
Sector St. Petersburg
Station St. Petersburg
Aids to Navigation Team St. Petersburg
Station Sand Key
Station Fort Myers Beach
Station Yankeetown
Station Cortez
USCGC Vise (WLIC-75305)
USCGC Joshua Appleby (WLM-556)
USCGC Marlin (WPB-87304)
USCGC Tarpon (WPB-87304)
USCGC Seahawk (WPB-87323)
USCGC Pelican (WPB-87327)
USCGC Hawk (WPB-87355)
USCGC Diamondback (WPB-87370)
District controlled units and cutters
Coast Guard Air Station Borinquen
Coast Guard Air Station Clearwater
Coast Guard Air Station Miami
Coast Guard Air Station Savannah
Air Facility Charleston
Operation Bahamas, Turks and Caicos
Maritime Force Protection Unit-Kings Bay
[[USCGC Sea Dragon (WPB-87367)
USCGC Sea Dog (WPB-87373)
USCGC Willow (WLB-202)

Eighth District 

Sector Corpus Christi
Station Port Aranas
Station Port O'Conner
Aids to Navigation Team Port O'Connor
Station South Padre Island
Aids to Navigation Team South Padre Island
Aids to Navigation Team Corpus Christi
Marine Safety Detachment Brownsville
Marine Safety Detachment Victoria
USCGC Mallet (WLIC-75304)
USCGC Coho (WPB-87321)
USCGC Sturgeon (WPB-87336)
USCGC Alligator (WPB-87372)
Sector Houston-Galveston
Station Freeport
Station Galveston
Aids to Navigation Team Galveston
Station Houston
Station Lake Charles
Marine Safety Unit Lake Charles
Station Sabine Pass
Aids to Navigation Team Sabine
Marine Safety Unit Port Arthur
Marine Safety Unit Texas City
USCGC Clamp (WLIC-75306)
USCGC Hatchet (WLIC-75309)
USCGC Manta (WPB-87320)
USCGC Beluga (WPB-87325)
USCGC Manowar (WPB-87330)
USCGC Pompano (WPB-87339)
Sector Lower Mississippi
Aids to Navigation Team Colfax
Marine Safety Detachment Vicksburg
USCGC Muskingum (WLR-75402)
USCGC Kickapoo (WLR-75406)
USCGC Kanawha (WLR-75407)
USCGC Patoka (WLR-75408)
USCGC Kankakee (WLR-75500)
USCGC Greenbrier (WLR-75501)
Sector Mobile
Station Dauphin Island
Station Destin
Station Gulfport
Aids to Navigation Team Gulfport
Station Panama City
Aids to Navigation Team Panama City
Marine Safety Detachment Panama City
Station Pascagoula
Station Pensacola
Aids to Navigation Team Pensacola
Aids to Navigation Team Eufaula
Aids to Navigation Team Mobile
USCGC Saginaw (WLIC-803)
USCGC Wedge (WLR-75307)
USCGC Stingray (WPB-87305)
USCGC Cobia (WPB-87311)
USCGC Kingfisher (WPB-87322)
Sector New Orleans
Station Grand Isle
Station New Orleans
Aids to Navigation Team New Orleans
Station Venice
Aids to Navigation Team Venice
Aids to Navigation Team Dulac
Aids to Navigation Team Morgan City
Marine Safety Unit Baton Rouge
Marine Safety Unit Houma
Marine Safety Unit Morgan City
USCGC Pamlico (WLIC-800)
USCGC Axe (WLIC-75310)
USCGC Razorbill (WPB-87332)
USCGC Brant (WPB-87348)
USCGC Skipjack (WPB-87353)
Sector Ohio Valley
Marine Safety Detachment Cincinnati
Marine Safety Detachment Nashville
Marine Safety Unit Huntington
Marine Safety Unit Paducah
Marine Safety Unit Pittsburg
USCGC Ouachita (WLR-65501)
USCGC Cimarron (WLR-65502)
USCGC Obion (WLR-65503)
USCGC Osage (WLR-65505)
USCGC Chippewa (WLR-75404)
USCGC Chena (WLR-75409)
Sector Upper Mississippi River
Marine Safety Detachment St. Paul
Marine Safety Detachment Quad Cities
Marine Safety Detachment Peoria
USCGC Scioto (WLR-65504)
USCGC Sangamon (WLR-65506)
USCGC Gasconade (WLR-75401)
USCGC Wyaconda (WLR-75403)
USCGC Cheyenne (WLR-75405)
District controlled units and cutters
Coast Guard Air Station New Orleans
Coast Guard Air Station Houston
Coast Guard Air Station Corpus Christi
USCGC Cypress (WLB-210)
USCGC Barbara Mabrity (WLM-559)
USCGC Harry Claiborne (WLM-561)
USCGC Benjamin B. Dailey (WPC-1123)
USCGC Jacob L.A. Paroo (WPC-1125)

Ninth District

Sector Buffalo
Station Alexandria Bay
Station Buffalo
Aids to Navigation Team Buffalo
Station Cleveland Harbor
Marine Safety Unit Cleveland
Station Erie
Station Fairport
Station Niagara
Station Oswego
Station Rochester
Marine Safety Detachment Massena
Sector Detroit
Station Belle Isle
Station Marblehead 
Station Port Huron
Station Saginaw River
Aids to Navigation Team Saginaw River
Station St. Clair Shores
Station Tawas
Station Toledo
Marine Safety Unit Toledo
Aids to Navigation Team Detroit
Sector Lake Michigan
Station Calumet Harbor
Station Grand Haven
Station Manistee
Station Michigan City
Station Milwaukee
Station Sheboygan
Station St. Joseph
Station Sturgeon Bay
Marine Safety Detachment Sturgeon Bay
Station Wilmette Harbor
Aids to Navigation Team Muskegon
Aids to Navigation Team Two Rivers
Marine Safety Unit Chicago
Sector Sault Sainte Marie
Station Bayfield
Station Charlevoix
Station Duluth
Aids to Navigation Team Duluth
Marine Safety Unit Duluth
Station Marquette
Station Portage
Station Sault Sainte Marie
Aids to Navigation Team Sault Ste. Marie
Station St. Ignace
District controlled units and cutters
Coast Guard Air Station Detroit
Coast Guard Air Station Traverse City
USCGC Hollyhock (WLB-214)
USCGC Alder (WLB-216)
USCGC Mackinaw (WLBB-30)
USCGC Buckthorn (WLI-642)
USCGC Katmai Bay (WTGB-101)
USCGC Bristol Bay (WTGB-102)
USCGC Mobile Bay (WTGB-103)
USCGC Biscayne Bay (WTGB-104)
USCGC Neah Bay (WTGB-105)
USCGC Morro Bay (WTGB-106)

Atlantic Area Controlled Units and Cutters
United States Coast Guard National Strike Force Coordination Center
United States Coast Guard Incident Management Assist Team
Public Information Assist Team
Atlantic Strike Team
Gulf Strike Team
Pacific Strike Team
United States Coast Guard Patrol Forces Southwest Asia
Port Security Unit Kuwait
Port Security Unit Bahrain
Maritime Engagement Team
USCGC Maui (WPB-1304)
USCGC Aquideck (WPB-1309)
USCGC Baranof (WPB-1318)
USCGC Monomoy (WPB-1326)
USCGC Wrangell (WPB-1332)
USCGC Adak (WPB-1333)
United States Coast Guard Activities Europe
USCGC Reliance (WMEC-615)
USCGC Diligence (WMEC-616)
USCGC Vigilant (WMEC-617)
USCGC Confidence (WMEC-619)
USCGC Resolute (WMEC-620)
USCGC Valiant (WMEC-621)
USCGC Dauntless (WMEC-624)
USCGC Venturous (WMEC-625)
USCGC Dependable (WMEC-626)
USCGC Vigorous (WMEC-627)
USCGC Decisive (WMEC-629)
USCGC Bear (WMEC-901)
USCGC Tampa (WMEC-902)
USCGC Harriet Lane (WMEC-903)
USCGC Northland (WMEC-904)
USCGC Spencer (WMEC-905)
USCGC Seneca (WMEC-906)
USCGC Escanaba (WMEC-907)
USCGC Tahoma (WMEC-908)
USCGC Campbell (WMEC-909)
USCGC Thetis (WMEC-910)
USCGC Forward (WMEC-911)
USCGC Legare (WMEC-912)
USCGC Mohawk (WMEC-913)
USCGC Hamilton (WMSL-753)
USCGC James (WMSL-754)
United States Coast Guard Incident Management Support Team
United States Coast Guard NORAD/USNORTHCOM
United States Coast Guard Reserve Unit-USSOUTHCOM
United States Coast Guard Reserve Unit-USNORTHCOM
United States Coast Guard Reserve Unit-USTRANSCOM

Pacific Area

Eleventh District 

Sector Humboldt Bay
Station Humboldt Bay
Aids to Navigation Team Humboldt Bay
Station Noyo River
USCGC Barracuda (WPB-87301)
USCGC Dorado (WPB-87306)
Sector Los Angeles/Long Beach
Station Channel Islands
Station Los Angeles/Long Beach
Aids to Navigation Team Los Angeles/Long Beach
Station Morro Bay
Marine Safety Detachment Santa Barbara
USCGC Blackfin (WPB-87317)
USCGC Blacktip (WPB-87326)
USCGC Narwhal (WPB-87335)
USCGC Halibut (WPB-87340)
USCGC Forrest Rednour(WPC-1129)
Sector San Diego
Station San Diego
Aids to Navigation Team San Diego
USCGC Haddock (WPB-87347)
USCGC Petrel (WPB-87350)
USCGC Sea Otter (WPB-87362)
Sector San Francisco
Station Bodega Bay
Station Golden Gate
Station Lake Tahoe
Station Monterey
Station Rio Vista
Station San Francisco
Aids to Navigation Team San Francisco
Station Vallejo
USCGC Hawksbill (WPB-87312)
USCGC Sockeye (WPB-87337)
USCGC Tern (WPB-87343)
USCGC Pike (WPB-87365)
District controlled units and cutters
Coast Guard Air Station Humboldt Bay
Coast Guard Air Station Sacramento 
Coast Guard Air Station San Diego
Coast Guard Air Station San Francisco
USCGC Aspen (WLB-208)
USCGC George Cobb (WLM-564)

Thirteenth District 

Sector Columbia River
Station Cape Disappointment
Station Greys Harbor
Station Portland
Marine Safety Unit Portland
Station Tillamook Bay
Aids to Navigation Team Astoria
Aids to Navigation Team Kennewick
USCGC Bluebell (WLI-313)
Sector North Bend
Station Chetco River
Station Coos Bay
Station Depoe Bay
Station Siuslaw River
Station Umpqua River
Station Yaquina Bay
Aids to Navigation Team Coos Bay
USCGC Orcas (WPB-1327)
Sector Puget Sound
Station Bellingham
Station Neah Bay
Station Port Angeles
Station Quillayute River
Station Seattle
Aids to Navigation Team Puget Sound
USCGC Cuttyhunk (WPB-1322)
USCGC Osprey (WPB-87307)
USCGC Adelie (WPB-87333)
USCGC Wahoo (WPB-87345)
USCGC Sea Lion (WPB-87352)
USCGC Swordfish (WPB-87358)
USCGC Blue Shark (WPB-87360)
USCGC Terrapin (WPB-87366)
District controlled units and cutters
Coast Guard Air Station Astoria
Coast Guard Air Station North Bend
Coast Guard Air Station Port Angeles
Maritime Force Protection Unit-Bangor
USCGC Sea Devil (WPB-87368)
USCGC Sea Fox (WPB-87374)
USCGC Fir (WLB-213)
USCGC Henry Blake(WLM-563)

Fourteenth District 

Sector Guam
Station Apra Harbor
Marine Safety Detachment Saipan
Sector Honolulu
Station Honolulu
Aids to Navigation Team Honolulu
Marine Safety Team Hawaii
Station Kauai
Station Maui
Marine Safety Team Maui
Marine Safety Detachment Samoa
USCGC Kittiwake (WPB-87316)
USCGC Ahi (WPB-87364)
District controlled units and cutters
USCG Activities Far East
Marine Inspection Detachment Singapore
Coast Guard Air Station Barbers Point 
USCGC Walnut (WLB-205)
USCGC Sequoia (WLB-215)
USCGC Washington (WPB-1331)
USCGC Kiska (WPB-1336)
USCGC Oliver F. Berry (WPC-1124)
USCGC Joseph Gerczak (WPC-1126)

Seventeenth District 

Sector Anchorage
Station Valdez
Marine Safety Unit Valdez
Aids to Navigation Team Kodiak
Marine Safety Detachment Dutch Harbor
Marine Safety Detachment Homer
Marine Safety Detachment Kodiak
USCGC Mustang (WPB-1310)
USCGC Naushon (WPB-1311)
USCGC Chandeleur (WPB-1319)
Sector Juneau
Station Juneau
Station Ketchikan
Marine Safety Detachment Ketchikan
Aids to Navigation Team Sitka
Marine Safety Detachment Sitka
USCGC Kukui (WLB-203)
USCGC Elderberry (WLI-65401)
USCGC Anthony Petit (WLM-558)
USCGC Liberty (WPB-1334)
USCGC Anacapa (WPB-1335)
USCGC John F. McCormick (WPC-1121)
USCGC Bailey T. Barco (WPC-1122)
District controlled units and cutters
Coast Guard Air Station Kodiak
Coast Guard Air Station Sitka
USCGC Spar (WLB-206)
USCGC Sycamore (WLB-209)
USCGC Hickory (WLB-212)
Aids to Navigation Team Kodiak

Pacific Area Controlled Units and Cutters

USCGC Polar Star (WAGB-10)
USCGC Polar Sea (WAGB-11)
USCGC Healy (WAGB-20)
USCGC Alex Haley (WMEC-39)
USCGC Active (WMEC-618)
USCGC Steadfast (WMEC-623)
USCGC Alert (WMEC-630)
USCGC Bertholf (WMSL-750)
USCGC Waesche (WMSL-751)
USCGC Stratton (WMSL-752)
USCGC Munro (WMSL-755)
USCGC Kimball (WMSL-756)
USCGC Mellon (WHEC-717)
USCGC Douglas Munro (WHEC-724)
USCGC Midgett (WHEC-726)
Maritime Safety and Security Team 91101
Maritime Safety and Security Team 91103
Maritime Safety and Security Team 91104
Maritime Safety and Security Team 91105
Maritime Safety and Security Team 91106
Maritime Safety and Security Team 91107
Maritime Safety and Security Team 91108
Maritime Safety and Security Team 91110
Maritime Safety and Security Team 91112
Maritime Safety and Security Team 91114
Port Security Unit 301
Port Security Unit 305
Port Security Unit 307
Port Security Unit 308
Port Security Unit 309
Port Security Unit 311
Port Security Unit 312
Port Security Unit 313
Tactical Law Enforcement Team Pacific
Tactical Law Enforcement Team South
Maritime Safety and Security Team-East
Maritime Safety and Security Team-West

References

Orders of battle